Grabowa is a river in the Pomerania region of northern Poland, 75 kilometers long. Its source is Lake Wockmin near Sławno (Schlawe), from where it flows to Darłowo (Rügenwalde) before it flows into the Wieprza (Wipper) river just a few kilometers before the Wieprza reaches the Baltic Sea. Near Jeźyce (Altenhagen), Grabowa forks with one arm flowing into Lake Buckow (Jezioro Bukowo, Buckowsee).

Rivers of Poland
Rivers of West Pomeranian Voivodeship